Anna Craycroft (born 1975) is an American conceptual artist who works with a variety of media, including sculpture, installation, intervention and public engagement. Craycroft was born in Eugene, Oregon. She earned her BA from the Slade School of Fine Art and her MFA from Columbia University School of the Arts.

Public sculpture
Craycroft has created public sculptures for:
the Socrates Sculpture Park (2004), 
the Lower Manhattan Cultural Center (2005), 
Art in General (2006), New York, and 
Den Haag Sculptuur, The Hague (2008).

Collections
Her work is included in the permanent collection of the Whitney Museum of American Art.

References

External links
 Official website

21st-century American women artists
21st-century American artists
1975 births
Living people
Artists from Eugene, Oregon

Columbia University School of the Arts alumni
Alumni of the Slade School of Fine Art